Omar Mohammed is a historian and citizen journalist from Mosul, Iraq, who documented life under ISIL through his blog Mosul Eye.

Early life and education 

Mohammed was born and raised in Mosul. He graduated from the University of Mosul in 2012 after defending his dissertation on the French occupation of Egypt. He taught at the same university for one year before ISIS closed it down in 2014.

His life under ISIS 
'All I could see was blood' is how Omar often describe the time he lived in Mosul under the rule of the ISIS, he became widely known for documenting the daily life in Mosul between 2003 and 2018. He still runs his blog from his exile. He traveled around the world to seek support for his city Mosul. A few months before the liberation of Mosul from ISIS, Omar organized a musical on the historical site of prophet Jonah on the east bank of Mosul to defy ISIS with music.

His efforts in Mosul 
“Let it there be a Book, Rising from the Ashes” is a project launched by Omar Mohammed to preserve the books from the destroyed library of the university of Mosul. The campaign led to preserve more than 32 thousands books and manuscripts. Speaking exclusively to The Independent, the historian said he hopes to collect at least 200,000 books, largely from international donations, to rebuild the university's central library and others across the city. In a phone interview with BuzzFeed News, he revealed very little about himself — "I can tell you I'm not 40 yet" — and insisted on anonymity to protect himself and his loved ones. But he spoke at length about his hopes for the library and why he is so invested in reviving it.

"Whenever I was in the university, I would spend most of my time at the library," he said. "When I didn't like my professors' lectures, I often went to the library to do research and study books on my own."

Role of Mosul Eye 
Access to the internet is still more limited in Mosul compared to the rest of Iraq. While IS did not restrict access to the internet as such, they imposed high taxes on internet providers leaving the city with limited access to this day (See UN Habit Report, 2016). Despite this, a number of growing local online media initiatives are proving to be popular. Ein Al Mosul, or Mosul Eye, was a blog, written anonymously, that documented events in Mosul under the occupation of IS, providing citizens of Mosul and, perhaps even more so, diaspora and the international community with vital information and evidence of IS atrocities. It focuses now on the ‘recovery’ of Mosul, structurally as well as culturally. ‘Mosul Eye was able to not only be a source of information but a social factor in the city’, according to its founder Omar Mohamed (2018 cited in Guardian Podcast, 2018). After the battle, Mosul Eye played a different role, ‘which is to rebuild civil society, trying to support the people who stayed in the city, trying to give them a voice, because they were voiceless’.

Mosul International Campaign 
Is a global campaign Omar launched to advocate and bring support to Mosul after he fled the city in December 2015. Omar began a long campaign travelling around the world giving speeches and talks, lecturing and  advocating at universities, institutes and other global venues. He travelled around Europe, United States, Russia and other countries. His mission was as he stated in his several public speeches is to "Put Mosul On The Global Map". He was invited by many international universities and governments. He has also, in different occasion, demanded the international community to put Mosul under international trusteeship to protect its people. “This is my city, I love Mosul more than anything else.”

Personal life 

, Mohammed lives in Paris and is unable to return to Mosul. His brother was killed in an airstrike when Mosul was retaken from ISIL.
Mohammed is a fan of Itzhak Perlman. He appeared in the 2020 documentary Once Upon a Time in Iraq.

Works 
Published works:

1- The history of the French expedition on Egypt in the writings of Abd al-Rahman al-Jabarti, Jordan 2013.

Omar has produced several documents but they are still unpublished manuscripts:

1- Annals of Mosul from 2003 to 2014. Unpublished manuscript.
2- The Chronicles of Mosul under the rule of the Islamic State.Unpublished manuscript.

The manuscript covers the history of Mosul from June 6, 2014 when ISIS occupied Mosul to July 2017 when the city was liberated.

3- the Wonders of Mosul's recovery and its surrounding areas.

Is a historical document written by Omar documenting the daily recovery of Mosul since its libration in 2017.

4- Al Tarikh al 'Umari fi 'Imār al jāmi al Nuri wa yalih-i 'Imar Kanisat-ul Sa'a wa-T Tahira'
5- Al 'Anfas al Mahbusa fi 'aldifaa' 'an al Mawsil al mahrusa "The Caged Breaths in Defending the Protected Mosul". Unpublished manuscript.

The front cover of the manuscript reads: "This is a declaration of what the humble to his god's mercy, Omar b. Mohammed al Mawsili in his exile (.... text removed) on his daily observation in (text removed) and other countries in defending of his hometown Mosul and its people to create a better future for his watan and protect its nation, may god protect it against all its enemies until god makes his return to Mosul possible"

Quotes

References 

University of Mosul alumni
21st-century Iraqi historians
Iraqi bloggers
Living people
1986 births